Slingshot is a disco/dance music band from Detroit, Michigan. Its members include Jack Tann, Greg Sawton, David Van DePitte and John Lewis.

Their one and only chart entry was a 1983 cover version of a medley of Steely Dan's song "Do It Again" and Michael Jackson's #1 hit single "Billie Jean", originally done in the same year by Italo disco studio project Clubhouse. This track (which is listed on the Rhino Records album Billboard Top Dance Hits 1983 as "Do It Again Medley with Billie Jean") hit #1 on the Billboard Hot Dance Club Play chart in August 1983. They also recorded a unique version of AC/DC's 1980 hit "You Shook Me All Night Long" with singer Kathy Kosins vocalizing the lyrics over Kraftwerk's "Tour de France", as performed by the group.

See also
List of number-one dance hits (United States)
List of artists who reached number one on the US Dance chart

External links
 Slinghot at www.djouls.com

American disco groups
American rhythm and blues musical groups
American dance music groups
Musical groups from Detroit